Crown is an unincorporated community in Stanford Township, Isanti County, Minnesota, United States.  The community is located north of St. Francis.

Isanti County Roads 7 and 8 are two of the main routes in the community.  State Highway 47 (MN 47) and U.S. Highway 169 are nearby.

History
Crown was founded in the late 19th century by primarily German immigrants and was a farming community. Among the first residents in the area were families with the surnames of Grams, Whittlef (also spelled Wittlief and Wittlef), Stockel, Lemke, Hartfiel, and Hass. Crown had a creamery, three stores with bars, a blacksmith shop, a garage repair shop, and a German Lutheran Church and a Lutheran School. 

The Lemke family owned the remaining community store from 1905 to 2005, when it was sold and renamed "Crown Gas and Goodies".

In 2008, a fire destroyed the County Line Bar and Grill, formerly Hierlinger’s general store, and the Farmers Cooperative Mercantile Company of West Stanford it reopened January 2013 at the same location. Crown largely consists of the store, County Line Bar, and Zion Lutheran Church and School one mile north of Crown. 

Frederick Wilhelm Grams (December 4, 1859 - May 5, 1918) was born in Friedentau, Germany. He was immigrated to the USA and was one of the founders of Crown, Minnesota. He was the son of Johann Samuel Grams and Anna "Jean" Redman, husband of Anna Margaret (Stockel) Grams, and father of Emma Louise Whittlef, Henry Bernhart Grams, and Harry Karl Grams. His brother was Pauline Grams. Frederick was a farmer and is buried in Crown. Anna Margaret (Stockel) Grams (February 18, 1863 - July 20, 1926) was born in Hanover, Niedersachsen, Germany. She is the daughter of Herman Stoeckel and Anna Margaret Elizabeth (Hoelscher) Stoeckel and sister of Louise Kathryn Bartz.

Esther Elsie (Warner) Whittlef (1915-2001) was a teacher at the original school in Crown and later taught elementary school in Anoka and Isanti schools. Esther was born in Anoka County to Herman and Marie (Bahr) Warner. She was baptized and confirmed at Zion Lutheran Church of Crown. Esther married farmer Clarence Otto Whittlef (1907-1958) in 1936. Clarence was born to Heinnich (Henry) Albert Whittlef (1882-1961) and Emma Louise (Grams) Whittlef in Spencer Brook Township, Isanti County, Minnesota. Another child, Donald, lived from 1917-1918. Emma died from myocarditis and complications from childbirth at the age of 37. 

Esther and Clarence Whittlef had had three sons, Duane, Lowell, and Lynn, and a daughter Janet. Their oldest son, Duane Clarence Whittlef (1937-2017), became a pastor and evangelist. He traveled to Belarus, Canada, England, Estonia, Germany, Haiti, Israel, Italy, Latvia, Lithuania, Mexico, the Netherlands, Poland, the Russian Federation, and Ukraine to share his faith. 

Senator Rodney Rod Dwight Grams (1948-2013) of Crown was the son of Audrey (Sandey) and Morgan Grams, son of Harry Karl Grams and Ethel (Lindmann) Grams. Rod was baptized and confirmed his faith at Zion Lutheran Church in Crown. He grew up on a dairy farm near Crown and graduated from St. Francis High School in the class of 1966. He attended Brown Institute, 1966-68, Anoka-Ramsey Community College, 1970-72, and Carroll College, 1974-75. Rod had a career as a television news anchor and producer that took him to KFBB-TV in Great Falls MT, WSAU-TV in Wausau WI, WIFR-TV in Rockford IL, which culminated with the position of senior news anchor for KMSP-TV in the Twin Cities, 1982 to 1991. In addition, he served as president and CEO of Sun Ridge Builders, a Twin Cities (Minneapolis/St. Paul) construction and residential development company that he established in 1985. In 1992, he was elected to represent Minnesotas Sixth Congressional District in the U.S. House of Representatives, where he served one term (1993-95) before being elected to the U.S. Senate, where he served one term (1995-2001). Subsequently, he went back into the private sector and in 2004 bought three radio stations in Little Falls MN and re-kindled his broadcasting career. <https://minnesota.funeral.com/2013/10/15/rodney-rod-grams/>

Infrastructure

Transportation
  United States Highway 169
  Minnesota State Highway 47
  Isanti County Road 8
  Isanti County Road 7

References

 Rand McNally Road Atlas – 2007 edition – Minnesota entry
 Official State of Minnesota Highway Map – 2013/2014 edition

Unincorporated communities in Minnesota
Unincorporated communities in Isanti County, Minnesota